The 2022 Women's Twenty20 Asia Cup was the eighth edition of the Women's Asia Cup tournament which took place from 1 to 15 October 2022 in Sylhet, Bangladesh. The tournament was contested between Bangladesh, India, Malaysia, Pakistan, Sri Lanka, Thailand and United Arab Emirates. On 20 September 2022, the Asian Cricket Council (ACC) announced the schedule of the tournament. Bangladesh were the defending champions, having defeated India by three wickets in the final of the 2018 tournament to win the title for the first time. The tournament was played at the Sylhet International Cricket Stadium. The seven teams played in a round-robin stage, with the top four progressing to the semi-finals.

The UAE and Malaysia qualified for the tournament by reaching the final of the 2022 ACC Women's T20 Championship, which was played in June 2022 in Malaysia.

In the round-robin stage, Thailand beat Pakistan by 4 wickets to register their first ever WT20I victory against their opponents.

Teams and qualifications

Squads
The following squads were announced for the tournament.

On 18 September 2022, Pakistan's Fatima Sana was ruled out of the tournament due to a twisted ankle, and was later replaced in the squad by Nashra Sandhu. India also named Simran Bahadur and Taniya Bhatia as standby players. Bangladesh named Sharmin Akhter, Marufa Akter, Rabeya Khan and Nuzhat Tasnia as standby players.

Round-robin

Points table

 Advanced to the semi-finals

Fixtures

Play-offs

Bracket

Semi-finals

Final

Statistics

Most runs

Most wickets

References

External links
 Series home at ESPNcricinfo

2022
Cricket
International cricket competitions in 2022–23
International cricket competitions in Bangladesh
2022 in women's cricket
Twenty20 Asia Cup